Vanuatu competed at the 2008 Summer Paralympics in Beijing. The country was making its return to the Paralympic Games, having been absent from the 2004 edition. Vanuatu sent only a small delegation with powerlifter Tom Tete as the only athlete, and did not win any medals.

Powerlifting

Men

See also
Vanuatu at the Paralympics
Vanuatu at the 2008 Summer Olympics

References

External links
International Paralympic Committee
Vanuatu Paralympic Committee

Nations at the 2008 Summer Paralympics
2008
Paralympics